Thimmanahalli Boraiah Jayachandra (29 July 1949) is an Indian politician and former member of the Karnataka Legislative Assembly from the Indian National Congress. He served as the Minister of Law and Parliamentary Affairs for Karnataka before losing his seat in 2018 assembly elections.

Political career
Jayachandra was first elected to the Karnataka Legislative Assembly in 1978. He was elected to the Karnataka Legislative Assembly after winning from Sira during the 2013 election with 74,089 votes. He lost from Sira in the Karnataka assembly elections 2018 to JD(S) candidate B Satyanarayana.

He has worked in various capacities in the Indian National Congress Party Organization at Taluk, District and State Level, Vice – President KPYCC 1979-81, All India Congress Committee between 1996 – 2000 & 2005 – 2008, 2012 till now, KPCC Election Management & Co-ordination Committee for 2008 General Election to Legislative Assembly, Strategy Committee for 1999 General Election to Legislative Assembly, Permanent Invitee for KPCC Executive Committee.

He was elected as a Member of the Karnataka Legislative Assembly, from the Kallambella & Sira constituencies of Tumkur District, Karnataka for 6 terms which shows his popularity and acceptance by the people. Jayachandra was also instrumental in bringing Hemavathi river water to the parched areas of Sira Taluks of Tumkur District. The people's protest and urge for Hemavathi water got an extra edge when Jayachandra took the leadership of this agitation and concluded this with the result of water entering the drought-hit Sira. Continuing from this, he took the challenge of taking the water further to Madalur lake in Sira taluk by constructing a channel to Madalur lake connecting Kalambella.

Barada Nadina Bhagiratha:
In 1997 “Krishna Kolla Neeravari Horata Samithi” was formed under his Chairmanship with farmers as members to fight for the implementation of the Upper Bhadra Project, as per the orders of Krishna Water Tribunal for the benefit of the farmers of drought-prone areas in Chickmagalur, Chitradurga and Tumkur districts. As a continuing effort he prevailed upon then Chief Minister S M Krishan in 2003 and played an important role in getting the cabinet's approval for Rs 2914 Crores in 2003. As a result of his continuous efforts, the Government of Karnataka gave revised administrative approval to take up the Upper Bhadra Project with an expenditure of Rs. 12,934 crores and the work is under progress. He is instrumental in making this project a reality and this project would help lakhs of farmers in parts of Chickmagalur, Chitradurga and Tumkur districts. For his outstanding efforts and work in the area of water, irrigation and agriculture people with love and affection started calling him Barada Nadina Bhagiratha (Bhagiratha of the drought-hit region).

Cabinet Minister:
The combination of Legislative assembly Opposition leader Shri Siddaramaiah and deputy leader Shri T B Jayachandra’s leadership, strategies and phenomenal Bellary padha yatra resulted in Congress's historical victory in the Karnataka assembly elections in the year 2013.

During this tenure (2013-2018) he was the Cabinet Minister and handled the portfolios of Law, Parliamentary Affairs, Animal Husbandry, Endowments, Higher Education and Minor Irrigation very efficiently. He was also the Chairman of 16 Cabinet Sub-Committees, Vice Chairman for one Cabinet Sub Committee and Member of 24 Cabinet Sub-Committees. Besides being Chairman of the Committee for Simplification, Strengthening, Tracking of Govt. Programmes.

He was instrumental in bringing up a series of barrages, bridge-cum-barrages, and impounding water structures to arrest the water and to increase the underground water table, due to his efforts the borewells got rejuvenated and agriculture cropping area drastically increased in Sira Taluk. Which got attention and was widely appreciated by the common man and lawmakers from across the Karnataka State. The same model was applied to the majority of parts of the state during his tenure as Minister of minor irrigation.

Development of Tumkur:
Education and Health care are other areas of interest for Jayachandra. His visionary ideas helped to bring HAL to Tumkur District. High-tech Mother and Child hospital and new upgraded Taluk Hospital in Sira. Numerous Government Hostels for all communities across Sira taluk. Starting of Government Polytechnique in Sira helped rural students to get into technical education with the required skill to compete with urban students. Mini Vidhana Soudha is about to inaugurate for effective administration, all set to provide Sira taluk with the potential to become the next district headquarters.

Achievements:
The below key positions held by him show his excellent track record as a lawmaker and parliamentarian of Karnataka State: DEPUTY LEADER of Opposition, Karnataka Legislative Assembly from 1994 – 99 and 2008 to 17-05-2013, The Minister for Agriculture, Government of Karnataka and District In-charge Minister of Tumkur District, from 17.10.1999 to 27.06.2002, SPECIAL REPRESENTATIVE of KARNATAKA at NEW DELHI: From 27.06.2002 to 11.12.2003 with the Status of Cabinet Minister, Minister for Food & Civil Supplies and District In-charge Minister of Mandya District, from 12.12.2003 to 28.5.2004, MINISTER for Law, Parliamentary Affairs, Animal Husbandry. Endowment (18.05.2013 – 30.10.2015) and District In-charge Minister of Tumkur District, MINISTER for Law, Parliamentary Affairs and Higher Education (from 30.10.2015 to 20.06.2016) and District In-charge Minister of Tumkur District, MINISTER for Law, Parliamentary Affairs and Minor Irrigation (from 21.06.2016 to 15.05.2018) and District In-charge Minister of Tumkur District.

48th Commonwealth Parliamentary Seminar:
Represented India at the 48th Commonwealth Parliamentary Seminar held at Westminster, U. K. in March 1999. As Minister for Higher Education visited the London School of Economics (LSE) and attended Education World Forum-2016 in January 2016. This visit has helped to start Dr B. R. Ambedkar School of Economics in Bengaluru on the lines of the London School of Economics. Widely travelled abroad to study Agriculture and the development of Industrial Sectors.

References

External links
 

Living people
1949 births
Indian National Congress politicians from Karnataka
Karnataka MLAs 2008–2013
Karnataka MLAs 2013–2018
People from Tumkur district